The Vertigo Tour was a worldwide concert tour by the Irish rock band U2. Staged in support of the group's 2004 album How to Dismantle an Atomic Bomb, the tour visited arenas and stadiums between March 2005 and December 2006. The Vertigo Tour consisted of five legs that alternated between indoor arena shows in North America and outdoor stadium shows internationally. Much like the previous Elevation Tour, the indoor portion of the Vertigo Tour featured a stripped-down, intimate stage design. Protruding from the main stage was an ellipse-shaped catwalk that encapsulated a small number of fans.

The tour grossed US$260 million in 110 sold-out concerts in 2005, making it the top-grossing tour of the year.  In North America alone, the tour grossed $138.9 million from 1.4 million tickets sold. The Vertigo Tour won the 2005 Billboard Roadwork Touring Awards for Top Tour, Top Draw, and Top Single Event, and U2's management company Principle Management won for Top Manager. By the time it finished, the Vertigo Tour had sold 4,619,021 tickets from 131 shows, and became the second-highest-grossing concert tour with $389 million earned. The tour was depicted in three concert films: Vertigo 2005: Live from Chicago, Vertigo: Live from Milan, and U2 3D.

Itinerary

After rehearsing for several months in Vancouver, and stage rehearsals at Baja Studios in Rosarito, Mexico. The tour's opening night was on 28 March 2005 at the iPayOne Center in San Diego, California. The first leg through North America consisted of 28 sold-out indoor arena shows and finished on 28 May in Boston, Massachusetts.

The second leg was a European stadium tour, commencing on 10 June in Brussels and finishing on 14 August in Lisbon. They played in a number of venues including Amsterdam, London, Dublin, Madrid, Milan, and Oslo. U2 broke Irish box office marks with ticket sales for three Croke Park concerts in Dublin, after more than 240,000 tickets were sold in record time. In The Netherlands, Belgium, France, and Austria, the tickets were all sold within 60 minutes.
 

The band then returned to North America in the autumn for the third leg, playing 50 sold-out shows in indoor arenas, starting on September 12 in Toronto and finishing up on December 19 in Portland, Oregon.

A fourth leg began on 12 February 2006 in Monterrey, Mexico, and ran through March visiting Mexico, Brazil, Argentina, and Chile; many of these locales had not seen a live U2 performance in nearly a decade and proved to be a hugely successful leg, with massive audiences attending these shows.

On 9 March 2006, it was announced the final 10 shows in New Zealand, Australia, Japan, and Hawaii were postponed due to guitarist The Edge's 7 year old daughter Sian's diagnosis of leukaemia. (The initial start of the tour had been postponed for the same reason, prior to any tickets being sold.) On 20 July 2006, it was announced that they were rescheduled for November and December, with some adjustments and additions of dates. The fifth leg started on 7 November in Brisbane, Australia and concluded on 9 December 2006 at Aloha Stadium in Honolulu, Hawaii after thirteen shows.

Stage design

The Vertigo Tour's production was designed by architect Mark Fisher and stage and lighting designer Willie Williams. Key elements were an ellipse-shaped ramp on the floor connected to the stage, with some fans inside it and some outside it (similar to the heart-shaped ramp used on the previous Elevation Tour). The inside area of the ellipse came to be known as the "bomb shelter", in reference to the supporting album.

In the North American shows, a set of seven retractable, see-through LED-based lighted bead curtains hung behind and to the side of the stage, showing abstract patterns, maps, moving figures, and occasionally text. The curtain design permitted concertgoers around the arena to have an excellent view of the curtains above the band and the images they displayed. The roll-drop LED screens were designed by Fisher using 360deg golf-ball pixels developed with Frederic Opsomer of Innovative Designs in Belgium. The spherical LED product joined the BARCO product line as the Mi-Sphere. The Vertigo Tour used 189 strings of these "MiSphere" LED balls suspended from custom truss, which allows the LED curtains to be rolled up. High above the center stage hung the MiSphere strings, each containing 64 spheres and totaling nine meters long. Dynamic, "moving" lights were also embedded in the stage and the B-stage ramp, as well. Four screens suspended above the stage showed close-ups of each member of the band, another element reused from the Elevation Tour.

For the European, Latin American and Australian stadium shows, the bead curtains were replaced by an LED screen behind the band.  The screen was assembled from BARCO O-Lite modules.  The assembly of the screen was similar to the rigging used for the LED screen in the PopMart Tour. The ellipse was also replaced with two catwalks leading to two B-stages in the style of the 'Vertigo target'.

Lighting gear list
The following gear was used for the show's lighting:
 54 Martin MAC 2000 Wash
 15 Vari*Lite VL3000
 37 Martin Atomic 3000 Strobe
 66 2x2 DWE audience blinders
 12 Lycian M2 Follow Spot
 6 Strong 3K Gladiator Follow Spot
 6 Saco Technologies LED Factory Light (custom)
 24 ETC Source Four Leko
 6 Lowell Tota light
 6 1x4 DWE audience blinders
 2 18K HMI Fresnel
 1 Flying Pig Systems WholeHog 3 console (running beta version of the new 1.3.9 software)
 189 MiSphere string
 4 Barco G10 projector
 5 Barco G5 projector
 5 Folsom Encore image processor

A PlayStation controller was used to control High End Systems DL1 units for audience shots presented on the large video screens.

Set list
The show's set list varied, with notable differences between each leg of the tour.

Main set

The arena shows of the first and third legs usually began with the same trio of songs: "City of Blinding Lights", "Vertigo", and "Elevation". On the first leg, "City of Blinding Lights" would alternate with "Love and Peace or Else", and sometimes "Beautiful Day" appeared in the opening trio. In contrast, the stadium concerts of the second leg opened with "Vertigo", "I Will Follow", and "The Electric Co.", though "I Will Follow's" position was occasionally occupied by other songs. By the fourth leg, "City of Blinding Lights", "Vertigo" and "Elevation" were the standard opening trio that was only altered once – early on in the fourth leg. After the opening trio, songs from U2's early days were played at the arena shows, while the stadium shows featured more anthemic rock songs. "New Year's Day", "Until the End of the World", "I Still Haven't Found What I'm Looking For", and "Miracle Drug" were examples of songs that often appeared in the main set. Beyond this point in the set list, the stadium and indoor sets became roughly similar. "Sometimes You Can't Make it on Your Own" was played at every show as a tribute to Bono's father. There was then a sequence of politically based songs (usually "Love and Peace or Else", "Sunday Bloody Sunday", and "Bullet the Blue Sky"), based around the theme of "Coexist" (written to show a Muslim Crescent, Jewish Star of David, and Christian Cross). Later, with flags of African nations displayed on the screens, "Where the Streets Have No Name" followed "Pride (In the Name of Love)". This led to a plea from Bono to participate in the ONE Campaign, while the opening of "One" played.

Encores

The encores varied from leg to leg, and night to night. The first encore was frequently a musical and visual look back to U2's Zoo TV Tour, usually featuring "Zoo Station", "The Fly", and "Mysterious Ways". However, for many shows on the third leg, this was discarded in favor of an acoustic encore. The second encore often showcased recent material, and almost all second-leg shows as well as rare first and third-leg shows ended with a repeat of "Vertigo", in homage to U2's early concert days when they would run out of songs to play. The usual concert finisher in the first leg was "40" where Adam and Edge would switch instruments, but over the course of the tour, many other closing songs would be used as well.

At the start of the much-delayed fifth leg in Australia, the usual first Zoo TV-style encore was used initially, but several shows into the leg "Zoo Station" was dropped in favour of "Mysterious Ways" with "The Fly" opening the encore, making the first encore "The Fly", "Mysterious Ways" and "With or Without You". The second encore, however, showcased three songs that had not been played until this point on the entire tour. "The Saints Are Coming" was played, following U2 and Green Day's using it to reopen the Louisiana Superdome. Up next was a full electric performance of "Angel of Harlem". Making its Vertigo Tour debut and closing a show for the first time ever was "Kite", which had not been played since the end of the Elevation Tour five years prior. "Kite" was accompanied by a didgeridoo and the show ended with Bono releasing a kite from one of the B-Stages. During the band's second show in Auckland, "One Tree Hill" replaced "Kite" as the show closer. The encore of the final concert of the tour in Honolulu included "The Saints Are Coming" featuring Billie Joe Armstrong, "Window in the Skies", and Neil Young's "Rockin' in the Free World" featuring Eddie Vedder and Mike McCready. The tour ended with the song "All I Want Is You".

Diversity of material played

The Vertigo Tour was notable not only for its diversity of material—it was the first tour since the Lovetown Tour to feature at least one song from each of their currently released albums—but for the rarity of some songs played. "The Ocean" had not been performed since December 1982. Tracks from their debut album Boy were chosen ahead of tracks from their biggest-selling album, The Joshua Tree. A number of other songs returned to the set list after absences of more than fifteen years, including material from October, while "The First Time", from 1993's Zooropa album, was played in full live for the first time. "Miss Sarajevo", a song from U2's side project Original Soundtracks No. 1, became a concert regular despite previously only being played live twice since its release in 1995.  Although Luciano Pavarotti sang the operatic vocals on the original, "Miss Sarajevo" featured Bono competently singing the operatic vocals. Also, "Discothèque", from 1997's Pop album, made its final two appearances. The Vertigo Tour has also featured Larry Mullen, Jr. on vocals on "Elevation", "Miracle Drug" and "Love and Peace or Else".  All but two songs ("A Man and a Woman" and "One Step Closer") from How to Dismantle an Atomic Bomb were performed on the tour. "Fast Cars", a bonus track on some countries' editions of the album, was also performed. "Walk On", the Grammy Award-winning song from All That You Can't Leave Behind, was played only sparingly on the tour, and barring performances in Brisbane and Sydney, was played in stripped-back acoustic form. Also "Bad", which was a regular on the Elevation Tour playlist, was played less frequently on this tour.

Concert filming
Two nights of the band's four-night engagement in Chicago, Illinois in May 2005 were filmed for the live DVD Vertigo 2005: Live From Chicago. During the European stadium leg of the Vertigo Tour in the summer of 2005, four more concerts were filmed: two in Dublin and two in Milan. Songs from the Milan shows were featured in a band profile on 60 Minutes and on U2.COMmunication. Ten songs performed at the Milan concert appeared as a special edition bonus DVD in U2's November 2006 compilation album U218 Singles. The 20 February 2006 show in São Paulo, Brazil was broadcast live by Rede Globo. Additionally, 700 hours of footage from seven Latin American concerts were filmed in 3D HD for the film U2 3D, released in 2008 in Real D Cinemas. On 18 and 19 November, additional U2 3D filming was done at the Melbourne concerts at Telstra Dome, as additional shots of the stage's LED display and the concert audience were needed.

Support acts
Support slots were taken up by Ash, Arcade Fire, Athlete, Dashboard Confessional, Feeder, Franz Ferdinand, Interpol, Kanye West, Keane, The Killers, Kings of Leon (U.S. leg only), Scissor Sisters, Snow Patrol, Starsailor (Cardiff only), Paddy Casey (Dublin only), Razorlight, Pearl Jam (Honolulu only) and The Zutons.

Reception
Like its predecessor, the Vertigo Tour was a commercial success, ranking as the top-earning tour of 2005 with US$260 million grossed. In North America alone, the tour grossed $138.9 million from 1.4 million tickets sold. The Vertigo Tour won the 2005 Billboard Roadwork Touring Awards for Top Tour, Top Draw, and Top Single Event, and U2's management company Principle Management won for Top Manager. By the time it finished, the Vertigo Tour had sold 4,619,021 tickets from 131 shows, and became the second-highest-grossing concert tour with $389 million earned. It was bested only by The Rolling Stones' A Bigger Bang Tour, which took place at roughly the same time but was longer overall.

Ticket presale controversy
The band's website, U2.com, was involved in a ticket presale controversy that upset fans. Users who paid $40 for a subscription to U2.com were promised the opportunity to purchase tickets in a presale that preceded any general public ticket sales. However, many fans were unable to purchase tickets, as technical glitches plagued the presale. Additionally, many scalpers had taken advantage of the system by subscribing to U2.com and purchasing as many tickets as possible, with the intentions of selling them for profit. Larry Mullen, Jr. apologized on behalf of the band at the Grammy Awards.

Tour dates

See also
Timeline of U2

Notes

References

External links

Vertigo Tour at U2.com

2005 concert tours
2006 concert tours
U2 concert tours